James Stewart Barry Henderson (born 29 April 1936) is a former British Conservative Party politician who served in the House of Commons on two occasions, February–October 1974 and 1979–87, both for Scottish constituencies.

Early life
Henderson was educated at Stowe. He worked as a computer systems advisor and at the Scottish Conservative and Unionist Party Central Office.

Parliamentary career
Henderson contested Edinburgh East at the 1966 general election. He was first elected as the Member of Parliament for East Dunbartonshire at the February 1974 general election. Although a constituency of this name had existed before that election, this was in effect a new constituency because of large-scale boundary changes, and the sitting MP Hugh McCartney had moved to Central Dunbartonshire. However, Henderson lost his seat at the October 1974 election, to Margaret Bain of the Scottish National Party, by just 22 votes.

At the 1979 general election, he was returned to Parliament as the MP for East Fife. After boundary changes for the 1983 general election, he was elected for North East Fife, which was largely the same constituency with only limited boundary changes. However, Henderson lost his seat at the 1987 general election to Menzies Campbell of the Liberal Democrats. Campbell would remain as the MP for the constituency until his retirement from the Commons 28 years later in 2015.

References 
Times Guide to the House of Commons June 1987
Who's Who 2007

External links 

1936 births
Living people
Scottish Conservative Party MPs
UK MPs 1974
UK MPs 1979–1983
UK MPs 1983–1987
People educated at Stowe School
Members of the Parliament of the United Kingdom for Scottish constituencies
Members of the Parliament of the United Kingdom for Fife constituencies